In Australia the predominant term used for SOEs is government business enterprise (GBE). Various Australian states also have GBEs, especially with respect to the provision of water and sewerage, and many state-based GBEs were privatized in some states during the last decade of the twentieth century. Former Commonwealth SOEs include Telstra, established in the 1970s as Telecom Australia. Telstra, now Australia's largest telecommunications company, was privatised in 1997 by the Howard government. As of June 2010 Telstra owned a majority of the copper wire infrastructure in Australia (the rest is owned by Optus) and is pending sale to its former parent, the Australian government, for a non-binding amount of 11 billion Australian dollars, as ducts in the copper wire tunnels are needed to install the fiber optic cable. The Commonwealth Bank, as its name indicates, was also founded as public company before later being privatized.

In Victoria many GBEs were sold in the 1990s to reduce the state's level of debt. The State Electricity Commission of Victoria and the Gas & Fuel Corporation were the best-known government enterprises to be disaggregated and sold.

Australian Government 

, there are nine GBEs of the Government of Australia, comprising two corporate Commonwealth entities and seven Commonwealth companies.

 ASC
 Australian Naval Infrastructure
 Australia Post (corporate Commonwealth entity)
 Australian Rail Track Corporation
 Defence Housing Australia (corporate Commonwealth entity)
 Moorebank Intermodal Company Limited
 NBN Co – fully owned and responsible for the rollout of the National Broadband Network
 Snowy Hydro (13%)
 WSA Co

The Government also has other public non-financial corporations (PFNCs) that are not prescribed as GBEs:
 Airservices Australia
 Australian Broadcasting Corporation
 Australian Government Solicitor
 Clean Energy Finance Corporation
 Future Fund
 Reserve Bank of Australia
 Screen Australia
 Special Broadcasting Service – fully owned, and combines government funding and commercial funding

Australian Capital Territory 
The GBEs of the Australian Capital Territory include:

 ActewAGL (50%)
 Icon Water

New South Wales 

The statutory state-owned corporations of New South Wales include:

 Essential Energy
 Forestry Corporation of New South Wales
 Hunter Water
 Landcom
 Newcastle Port Corporation, trading as the Port Authority of New South Wales
 Superannuation Administration Corporation
 Sydney Water
 Transport Asset Holding Entity
 WaterNSW

Northern Territory 
The GBEs of the Northern Territory include:
 PowerWater
 Territory Generation

Queensland 
The GBEs of Queensland include:

 CS Energy
 Energex
 Ergon Energy
 Powerlink Queensland
 Gladstone Ports Corporation
 Port of Townsville
 Port of Mackay
 Queensland Investment Corporation
 Queensland Rail
 SunWater
 Suncorp Group
 Stanwell Corporation
 Tarong Energy

South Australia 
South Australia is notable for having very controversially privatized most of its GBEs:
 Adelaide Metro
 SA Water

Tasmania 
Tasmania has a considerable amount of GBEs, relative to other states:

 Aurora Energy
 Forestry Tasmania
 Hydro Tasmania
 Irrigation Tasmania
 Metro Tasmania
 Motor Accidents Insurance Board
 Port Arthur Historic Site Management Authority
 Public Trustee
 Spirit of Tasmania
 TasRail
 Tascorp
 TasNetworks 
 TasPorts
 TasWater

Victoria 
The GBEs of Victoria include:

 Port of Hastings
 Port of Melbourne
 Snowy Hydro (29%)
 VicForests
 VicTrack
 V/Line

Western Australia 
The GBEs of Western Australian include:

 DevelopmentWA
 Fremantle Port Authority
 Gold Corporation
 Horizon Power
 Kimberley Ports Authority
 Mid-West Ports Authority
 Pilbara Ports Authority
 Southern Ports Authority
 Synergy
 Water Corporation
 Western Power

References

 
State-owned
Australia
Australia